Kerry Margaret Heysen (Born May 30, 1945) is an Australian film producer from Adelaide, South Australia, known for her work on Shine (1996), Snow Falling on Cedars (1999), No Reservations (2007), GLASS: A Portrait of Philip in Twelve Parts (2007) and The Lucky One (2012).

Early Life 
Heysen was born Kerry Margaret Madigan in Adelaide, South Australia and was educated at Cabra College and Flinders University. Her father, Ted Madigan was a radio broadcaster. 

Widowed at a young age and with a new born son, she returned to school and entered Flinders University.

Career 
Her company developed the film Shine which was nominated for seven Academy Awards, five Golden Globes, nine BAFTAS, and won nine Australian Film Institute Awards.

She is CEO and a Founding Director of the Kino Films Group of Companies, Color and Movement Films USA.

Awards 
In 2006, Flinders University awarded her a Distinguished Alumni Award.

In 2009, Heysen produced GLASS: A Portrait of Philip in Twelve Parts, which won the 2009 Australian Film Institute Awards for Best Feature Length Documentary. 

In 2014, Heysen was named as one of the most Influential Women of South Australia.

At the 2019 Queen’s Birthday Honours, Heysen was made a Member of the Order of Australia for significant service to film, and to women. 

In 2020, Heysen was awarded The Premier’s Lifetime Achievement Award jointly with her husband Scott Hicks.

In 2022, an Honorary Doctorate of Letters was awarded to her by Flinders University of South Australia.

Filmography

Executive Producer 

 Glass: A Portrait of Philip in Twelve Parts (2007)

Producer 

 Highly Strung (2015)
 No Reservations (2007)
 Hearts in Atlantis (2001)

Co-Producer 

 Fallen (2016)
 The Lucky One (2012 )

Associate Producer 

 Snow Falling on Cedars (1999

Creative Consultant 

 Shine (1996)

References

1945 births
Living people